Padmini acted in Tamil, Hindi, Malayalam, Telugu and Russian language films. Padmini, with her elder sister Lalitha and her younger sister Ragini, were called the "Travancore sisters". She has overall appeared in 226 films- 142 in Tamil, 37 in Hindi, 28 in Malayalam, 15 in Telugu, 2 in Sinhala and one in each Russian & French languages respectively.

Filmography (in order of languages, which she appeared from most to least films)

Tamil

Hindi

Malayalam

Telugu

Sinhala

Russian

French

TV series

Dramas
 Ramayana
 Kalpana
 Valli
 Kannaki
 Dashavatharam
 Sri Krishna Leela
 Parijata Pushpaharanam

References

Actress filmographies
Indian filmographies